Cheiracanthium furculatum is a spider species found in the Cape Verde Islands, mainland Africa, and the Comoro Islands. It has also been introduced into Belgium.

See also 
 List of Eutichuridae species

References

External links 

furculatum
Spiders of Europe
Spiders of Africa
Spiders described in 1879